Norman Avzal Simons (born 12 January 1967), known as The Station Strangler, is a South African rapist and suspected serial killer who was convicted in 1995 of the rape and murder of 10-year-old Elroy van Rooyen. He was sentenced to 35 years (25 for murder and 10 for kidnapping) in prison.

Biography 

Simons was an intelligent individual who enjoyed playing classical music and was capable of speaking seven languages including English, Afrikaans, Xhosa and French. He was employed as a Grade Five teacher at Alpine Primary School in Beacon Valley, Mitchell's Plain. Simons' victims were all young boys aged between 9 and 13. His victims were majority from the KHOIKHOI First nations  community.

Simons is believed to have started his sporadic series of murders on 29 October 1986, ending only with his arrest nine years later in April 1994. He collected his moniker after it became apparent that most of his victims were lured away from train stations (Soviet serial killer Andrei Chikatilo had a similar modus operandi).

Simons raped and sodomised his victims before strangling them. Victims were found face down with their hands tied behind their backs, buried in shallow sandy graves. In some cases the victims were found with their underwear around their necks, presumably used as a garrote. Hand-written notes were also found next to some victims. Simons' relationship with his older stepbrother seems to have a major bearing on his criminal activities. Simons alleges that his older stepbrother raped and sodomised him as a child. He also reports 'hearing voices' from his brother instructing him to kill. Simons' brother, an alcoholic, was murdered in 1991.

Simons appeared before magistrates in 1995 on one charge of murder and kidnap. His trial lasted three months, leading to a conviction and life sentence. He is currently serving his sentence in Drakenstein Maximum Correctional Facility, Paarl. Simons appealed against his conviction in 1998, but his conviction was upheld.

In 2005, an inquest was opened into the deaths of the remaining victims. After three years of further analysis, the victims' parents came no closer to an answer. On 9 December 2008, Regional Magistrate Marelize Rolle stated that she believed prima facie evidence showed Simons was probably responsible for the deaths of at least six of the other victims. However, due to the amount of time that had passed, she ruled out further prosecutions in the case.
 
Norman Simons converted to Islam in 1993, taking on the name Avzal, but converted back to Christianity in 1994.

See also
List of serial killers by country
List of serial killers by number of victims

References 

1967 births
Converts to Islam from Christianity
Converts to Christianity from Islam
Living people
People convicted of murder by South Africa
People from Cape Town
South African murderers of children
South African people convicted of murder
South African rapists
Suspected serial killers
Violence against men in Africa